Agrostopoa is a genus of flowering plants belonging to the family Poaceae.

Its native range is Colombia.

Species:

Agrostopoa barclayae 
Agrostopoa wallisii 
Agrostopoa woodii

References

Poaceae
Poaceae genera